Paul Daly (born 26 June 1965) is an Irish Fianna Fáil politician who has served as a Senator for the Agricultural Panel since April 2016. 

He was a member of Westmeath County Council from 2008 to 2016.

He is the Fianna Fáil Seanad spokesperson on Agriculture, Food and Marine.

Following his involvement in the Oireachtas Golf Society Scandal ("golfgate") in August 2020, Daly was one of six senators who lost the party whip in the Senate as punishment for their actions.

References

External links
Paul Daly's page on the Fianna Fáil website

1965 births
Living people
Fianna Fáil senators
Members of the 25th Seanad
Members of the 26th Seanad
People from Kilbeggan
Local councillors in County Westmeath